River Mora Diphlu is a rivulet and a tributary of the River Diphlu which originates from the Karbi Anglong hills, Assam and passes through the Kaziranga National Park and joins the River Brahmaputra on its south bank.

Rivers of Assam
Karbi Anglong district
Rivers of India